Bowling Green, Kentucky is the 182nd largest media market in the United States, with roughly 78,870 homes, 0.069% of all homes in the United States. As of 2022, the Bowling Green DMA comprises Barren, Butler, Edmonson, Hart, Metcalfe, and Warren Counties in Kentucky.

Print

Daily newspapers 
Bowling Green Daily News 
College Heights Herald - the student newspaper at Western Kentucky University

Free publications  
Clip-It Shopper
Country Peddler 
South Central Kentucky Homes
SOKY Happenings
The Sporting Times

Television stations

Local stations 

Bowling Green's local cable television operator is Spectrum (formerly Time Warner Cable).

Out-of-market stations 
In addition to the stations listed above, Bowling Green is, by default, also served by the following out-of-market television stations listed below due to the close proximity to the area.

Radio stations 
While Bowling Green does not really currently have its own radio market, the general area is served by numerous radio stations. The Bowling Green radio market originally included Allen, Barren, Edmonson, Hart, Metcalfe, and Warren Counties.

AM stations

Local

Adjacent locals
WHAS Louisville (News/Talk) - 840 AM #
WLAC Nashville (News/Talk) - 1510 AM #
WLCK Scottsville (Religious) - 1250 AM 
WRUS Russellville, KY (Country) - 610 AM 
WSM Nashville (Classic Country) - 650 AM #

# - Clear-channel AM radio station; best quality signal at night.

FM stations

Local

Adjacent locals 
WBKR/Owensboro - (Country) - 92.5 FM 
WCVQ/Fort Campbell, KY-Clarksville, TN - 107.9 FM 
WHOP-FM/Hopkinsville - (Adult Contemporary) - 98.7 FM  
WJCR/Upton/Elizabethtown - (Gospel music) - 90.1 FM 
WJXA/Nashville - (Adult Contemporary) - 92.9 FM
WCJK/Murfreesboro-Nashville - (Adult Hits/Jack FM) - 96.3 FM 
WGFX/Gallatin-Nashville - (Sports) - 104.5 FM 
WKDF Nashville - (Country/Nash Icon) - 103.3 FM
WNRQ/Nashville (Classic Rock) - 102.9 FM 
WPRT-FM/La Vergne-Nashville - (Sports) - 102.5 FM 
WEKV/Central City-Owensboro - (Contemporary Christian/K-Love) - 101.9 FM
WRVW/Lebanon-Nashville - (Top 40/CHR) - 107.5 FM  
WSIX-FM/Nashville - (Country) - 97.9 FM 
WSM-FM/Nashville - (Country/Nash FM) - 95.5 FM 
WUBT/Russellville, KY-Nashville, TN (Hip Hop) - 101.1 FM
WVVR/Hopkinsville (Country) - 100.3 FM

NOAA Weather Radio
Bowling Green is also served by two NOAA Weather Radio stations:
KIH45 at 162.400 MHz (primary coverage) 
WNG570 (Horse Cave) at 162.500 MHz (secondary coverage)

See also
 Kentucky media
 List of newspapers in Kentucky
 List of radio stations in Kentucky
 List of television stations in Kentucky
 Media of cities in Kentucky: Lexington, Louisville

References

 
 

Bowling Green
 
Bowling Green
Bowling Green media